A ball is a round object (usually spherical, but can sometimes be ovoid) with several uses. It is used in ball games, where the play of the game follows the state of the ball as it is hit, kicked or thrown by players. Balls can also be used for simpler activities, such as catch or juggling. Balls made from hard-wearing materials are used in engineering applications to provide very low friction bearings, known as ball bearings. Black-powder weapons use stone and metal balls as projectiles.

Although many types of balls are today made from rubber, this form was unknown outside the Americas until after the voyages of Columbus. The Spanish were the first Europeans to see the bouncing rubber balls (although solid and not inflated) which were employed most notably in the Mesoamerican ballgame. Balls used in various sports in other parts of the world prior to Columbus were made from other materials such as animal bladders or skins, stuffed with various materials.

As balls are one of the most familiar spherical objects to humans, the word "ball" may refer to or describe spherical or near-spherical objects.

"Ball" is used metaphorically sometimes to denote something spherical or spheroid, e.g., armadillos and human beings curl up into a ball, making a fist into a ball.

Etymology 
No Old English representative of any of these is known. (The answering forms in Old English would have been beallu, -a, -e—compare bealluc, ballock.) If ball- was native in Germanic, it may have been a cognate with the Latin foll-is in sense of a "thing blown up or inflated." In the later Middle English spelling balle the word coincided graphically with the French balle "ball" and "bale" which has hence been erroneously assumed to be its source. French balle (but not boule) is assumed to be of Germanic origin, itself, however. In Ancient Greek the word πάλλα (palla) for "ball" is attested besides the word σφαίρα (sfaíra), sphere.

History

A ball, as the essential feature in many forms of gameplay requiring physical exertion, must date from the very earliest times. A rolling object appeals not only to a human baby, but to a kitten and a puppy. Some form of game with a ball is found portrayed on Egyptian monuments, and is played among aboriginal tribes at the present day. In Homer, Nausicaa was playing at ball with her maidens when Odysseus first saw her in the land of the Phaeacians (Od. vi. 100). And Halios and Laodamas performed before Alcinous and Odysseus with ball play, accompanied with dancing (Od. viii. 370). The most ancient balls in Eurasia have been discovered in Karasahr, China and are 3.000 years old. They were made of hair-filled leather.

Ancient Greeks
Among the ancient Greeks, games with balls (σφαῖραι) were regarded as a useful subsidiary to the more violent athletic exercises, as a means of keeping the body supple, and rendering it graceful, but were generally left to boys and girls. Of regular rules for the playing of ball games, little trace remains, if there were any such. The names in Greek for various forms, which have come down to us in such works as the Ὀνομαστικόν of Julius Pollux, imply little or nothing of such; thus, ἀπόρραξις (aporraxis) only means the putting of the ball on the ground with the open hand, οὐρανία (ourania), the flinging of the ball in the air to be caught by two or more players; φαινίνδα (phaininda) would seem to be a game of catch played by two or more, where feinting is used as a test of quickness and skill. Pollux (i. x. 104) mentions a game called episkyros (ἐπίσκυρος), which has often been looked on as the origin of football. It seems to have been played by two sides, arranged in lines; how far there was any form of "goal" seems uncertain. It was impossible to produce a ball that was perfectly spherical; children usually made their own balls by inflating pig's bladders and heating them in the ashes of a fire to make them rounder, although Plato (fl. 420s BC – 340s BC) described "balls which have leather coverings in twelve pieces".

Ancient Romans
Among the Romans, ball games were looked upon as an adjunct to the bath, and were graduated to the age and health of the bathers, and usually a place (sphaeristerium) was set apart for them in the baths (thermae). There appear to have been three types or sizes of ball, the pila, or small ball, used in catching games, the paganica, a heavy ball stuffed with feathers, and the follis, a leather ball filled with air, the largest of the three. This was struck from player to player, who wore a kind of gauntlet on the arm. There was a game known as trigon, played by three players standing in the form of a triangle, and played with the follis, and also one known as harpastum, which seems to imply a "scrimmage" among several players for the ball. These games are known to us through the Romans, though the names are Greek.

Modern ball games
The various modern games played with a ball or balls and subject to rules are treated under their various names, such as polo, cricket, football, etc.

Round balls

Prolate spheroid balls 
Several sports use a ball in the shape of a prolate spheroid:

See also 
 Ball (mathematics)
 Buckminster Fullerene "Bucky balls"
 Football (ball)
 Kickball
 Marbles
 Penny floater
 Prisoner Ball
 Shuttlecock
 Super Ball

References

External links